Refuge Emílio Goeldi is a Brazilian Antarctic summer facility named after the Swiss-Brazilian naturalist and zoologist Émil Goeldi. Built in 1988, the structure is located on Elephant Island, South Shetland Islands, Antarctica.

The structure can accommodate up to 6 scientists for up to 40 days, and depends both logistically and administratively on Comandante Ferraz station. It and Refuge Astronomer Cruls, located on Nelson Island, constitute the basic infrastructure to support the Brazilian Antarctic Program in Antarctica.

See also
 List of Antarctic research stations
 List of Antarctic field camps
Refuge Astronomer Cruls
Brazilian Antarctic Program

References

Brazilian Antarctica
Outposts of the South Shetland Islands
Outposts of Antarctica
1988 establishments in Antarctica